Arenal River is a river of Costa Rica that is a tributary of the San Carlos River. Its upper part is dammed by the Presa Sangregado Dam to form the Lake Arenal.

References

Rivers of Costa Rica